Bağçatağı is a village in Çamlıyayla district of Mersin Province, Turkey. The population of Bağçatağı was 107 as of 2012.

References

Villages in Çamlıyayla District